Musicians United for Safe Energy, or MUSE, is an activist group founded in 1979 by Jackson Browne, Graham Nash, Bonnie Raitt, Harvey Wasserman and John Hall.  The group advocates against the use of nuclear energy, forming shortly after the Three Mile Island nuclear accident in March 1979.  MUSE organized a series of five No Nukes concerts held at Madison Square Garden in New York in September 1979.  On September 23, 1979, almost 200,000 people attended a large rally staged by MUSE on the then-empty north end of the Battery Park City landfill in New York.

Other musicians performing at the concerts included Crosby, Stills, and Nash, Bruce Springsteen and the E Street Band, James Taylor,  Carly Simon, Chaka Khan, the Doobie Brothers, Jesse Colin Young, Gil Scott-Heron, Tom Petty, Dan Fogelberg, Poco and others.  The album No Nukes, and a film, also titled No Nukes, were both released in 1980 to document the performances. A full No Nukes concert featuring Browne and Crosby, Stills & Nash was also filmed near the beach in Ventura, California, at the Ventura County Fairgrounds, but none of that footage made it into the final cut.

In the 2006 midterm elections, Hall was elected to the United States House of Representatives from New York's 19th congressional district, on a platform that included intensive investment in alternative energy. He defeated the incumbent, Sue Kelly.

In 2007, Raitt, Nash, and Browne, as part of the No Nukes group, recorded a music video of the Buffalo Springfield song "For What It's Worth".

Thirty two years after the No Nukes concert in New York, on August 7, 2011, a MUSE benefit concert was held at Shoreline Amphitheater in Mountain View, CA. to raise money for MUSE and for Japanese tsunami/nuclear disaster relief. Artists included Jackson Browne, Bonnie Raitt, John Hall, Graham Nash, David Crosby, Stephen Stills, Kitaro, Jason Mraz, Sweet Honey in the Rock, the Doobie Brothers, Tom Morello, and Jonathan Wilson. The show was powered off-grid.

See also
Alliance for Nuclear Responsibility
Anti-nuclear movement in the United States
Abalone Alliance
Shad Alliance
Anti-nuclear protests in the United States
Great Peace March for Global Nuclear Disarmament
Mothers for Peace
Clamshell Alliance

References

External links
 Official Website

Musical advocacy groups
Political advocacy groups in the United States
Anti–nuclear power movement
Three Mile Island accident
Organizations established in 1979
Renewable energy organizations based in the United States